Bajrangarh Fort (also known as Jharkon) is located in Bajrangarh village of Guna District in the Indian state of Madhya Pradesh.
It was built by the Yadav (Ahir) King Jai Narayan Singh of Nandvanshi Branch in 1600 AD.
It spreads over 72 bighas of land on a high hill. ,it was the headquarters of a mahal of the Chanderi Sarkar. During the reign of Raja Jai Singh, Daulatrao Scindia sent his General, John Baptiste to attack the fort in 1816 A.D. Raja Jai Singh was defeated and the fort was destroyed. The Bajrangarh fort had four gates in four directions. Inside the fort, Moti Mahal, Rangmahal, Ram Mandir, and Bajrang Mandir are still intact.

There is a big step well inside the complex that was used for storing drinking water for the horses. The fort also has an ancient temple which is frequented by local inhabitants. It is believed to have been constructed by the Maratha rulers in 1775.

Geography

It spreads over 72 bighas of land on a high hill.

Precincts

The Bajrangarh fort had four gates in four directions. Inside the fort, Moti Mahal, Rangmahal, Ram Mandir, and Bajrang Mandir are still intact.

There is a big step well inside the complex that was used for storing drinking water for the horses. The fort also has an ancient temple that is frequented by local inhabitants.

References 

Villages in Guna district
Forts in Madhya Pradesh